Hatzor HaGlilit  ( lit. "Hatzor of Galilee") is a town in the Korazim Plateau in northern Israel near Rosh Pinna and Safed. It is named for the nearby biblical site of Tel Hazor.

History

Ancient Hazor 

Hatzor HaGlilit is named after the biblical city of Hazor, a Canaanite and later Israelite city belonging to the tribe of Naphtali (Joshua 19:36). In 732 BCE, it was conquered by Tiglath-Pileser III of the Neo-Assyrian Empire, and its population was deported, while the city was burnt to the ground.

Ancient Hazor was discovered in Tel Hazor, a tell located near kibbutz Ayelet HaShahar, few kilometers north of Hazor HaGlilit.

Modern Hatzor HaGlilit 
Hatzor HaGlilit was founded in 1952–1953 as a transit camp. The new camp was located on the land of the  depopulated Palestinian village of Mughr al-Khayt, 1 km southeast of the village site. The two adjacent transit camps were initially named "Hatzor A" and "Hatzor B", named for the nearby biblical site of Tel Hatzor, and housed immigrants and refugees, primarily Jews from North Africa.

In 1956, Hatzor HaGlilit was given the status of local council. By 1958, Hatzor HaGlilit had a population of 4,000 and received development town status. Over time, the city preserved its Jewish religious-traditional demographic status and later a Jewish Ultra-orthodox neighbourhood was also established, housing Gur Hassids.

In December 2011, according to the Central Bureau of Statistics, Hazor was populated by 8,705 residents, with 0.0% population growth.

Landmarks
One of the town's most well-known landmarks is the tomb of Honi the Circle-Maker, adjoining the burial sites of two of his grandsons, Abba Hilkiyah and Hanan HaNihba. According to Jewish legend, Honi HaM'agel had the power to bring rain through his prayers. The presence of this shrine attracted a large Gerrer hassid population to the town.

References

Bibliography

Orthodox Jewish communities
Development towns
Populated places established in 1953
Local councils in Northern District (Israel)
Jewish pilgrimage sites
1953 establishments in Israel
Tel Hazor